Piergiorgio Bontempi (born 6 February 1968) is an Italian former professional motorcycle racer.

Born in Ancona, he competed in the Superbike World Championship for over ten years. Bontempi also competed in the Supersport World Championship, winning one race at the Nürburgring in 1999.

Career statistics

Superbike World Championship

Races by year
(key) (Races in bold indicate pole position) (Races in italics indicate fastest lap)

Supersport World Championship

Races by year

References

Living people
1968 births
Sportspeople from Ancona
Italian motorcycle racers
Superbike World Championship riders
Supersport World Championship riders